Petrakiopeltis is a genus of fungi in the Microthyriaceae family; according to the 2007 Outline of Ascomycota, the placement in this family is uncertain. This is a monotypic genus, containing the single species Petrakiopeltis byrsonimae.

The genus name of Petrakiopeltis is in honour of Franz Petrak (1886–1973), who was an Austrian-Czech mycologist. 

The genus was circumscribed by Augusto Chaves Batista, A. Fernandes Vital and Raffaele Ciferri in Ist. Bot. Univ. Lab. Crittog. Pavia Atti series 5, vol.15 on pages 42-44 in 1958.

References

External links
Index Fungorum

Microthyriales
Monotypic Dothideomycetes genera